is a Japanese photographer, filmmaker, arts curator and art theorist. He is also Professor at the Tama Art University since 1995.

In 2000, Minato served as curator of the arts exhibition Serendipity: Photography, Video, Experimental Film and Multimedia Installation from Asia. Among his other major curatorial works is the Japanese Pavilion at the Venezia Biennale (Venice, Italy) in 2007.

References

Bibliography
Nihon shashinka jiten / 328 Outstanding Japanese Photographers. Kyoto: Tankōsha, 2000. .  Despite the English-language alternative title, all in Japanese.
 « Chihiro Minato: Only Once », art press, number 353, 2009

Japanese photographers
1960 births
Living people